Croatia is a country in Southeastern Europe.

Croatia may also refer to:

 any of the historical Croatian states:
 Principality of Croatia, early medieval Croatian principality, from the 7th century up to 925
 Kingdom of Croatia (925-1102), an independent medieval Croatian kingdom
 Kingdom of Croatia (1102-1526), medieval Croatian kingdom in personal union with the Kingdom of Hungary
 Kingdom of Croatia (1526-1867), early modern Croatian kingdom within the Habsburg Monarchy
 Kingdom of Croatia and Slavonia (1867-1918), an autonomous kingdom under Hungary within Austria-Hungary
 Banate of Croatia (1939-1941), an autonomous Croatian entity within the Kingdom of Yugoslavia
 Independent State of Croatia (1941-1945), a puppet state of Italy and Germany during World War II
 People’s Republic of Croatia (1946-1963), a federal unit of the Federal People’s Republic of Yugoslavia
 Socialist Republic of Croatia (1963-1990), a federal unit of the Socialist Federal Republic of Yugoslavia
 Croatia proper, a geographical region in Croatia
 Croatia (European Parliament constituency)

See also
 White Croatia
 Red Croatia
 Kingdom of Croatia (disambiguation)
 Medieval Croatia (disambiguation)
 Pannonian Croatia (disambiguation)
 Littoral Croatia (disambiguation)
 Greater Croatia
 Eastern Croatia
 Southern Croatia
 Croatian (disambiguation)